Bashnet is an administrative ward in Babati District of Manyara Region of Tanzania. According to the 2002 census, the ward has a total population of 17,298.

References

Babati District
Wards of Manyara Region